HD 16417 b (also called λ2 Fornacis b) is an extrasolar planet located approximately 83 light years away in the constellation of Fornax, orbiting the 6th magnitude G-type main sequence star HD 16417. This planet has minimum mass only 7% that of Jupiter, making this a Neptune-mass planet. In addition to this, it orbits relatively close to the host star and suffers high temperature. It is the third planet discovered in Fornax constellation on February 23, 2009. This planet was discovered by a method called the radial velocity method.

References

Exoplanets discovered in 2009
Giant planets
Fornax (constellation)
Exoplanets detected by radial velocity
Hot Neptunes